The Betsiamites (also called Bersimis) is a river of Côte-Nord, Quebec, Canada, which joins the Saint Lawrence River.

The  Pipmuacan Reservoir, impounded by the Bersimis-1 Dam, is roughly halfway down its course.

Hydro-electric facilities
There are two hydro-electric power stations and dams on the Betsiamites, owned by Hydro-Québec:
 Bersimis-1 generating station: 1,125 MW; constructed in 1956
 Bersimis-2 generating station: 845 MW; constructed in 1959

References

External links
 Hydro-Québec - Système hydrique de la rivière Bersimis.

Hydro-Québec
Rivers of Côte-Nord
Rivers of Saguenay–Lac-Saint-Jean